Those Who Watch is a science fiction novel by American  writer Robert Silverberg, first published by Signet in 1967. The novel concerns a trio of alien explorers, each one surgically altered so as to appear outwardly human, who find themselves separated, and permanently stranded on Earth, after their ship explodes while hovering in low orbit. Each of the aliens is injured during the accident, and all are taken in and nursed back to health by kindly human beings.

External links
Those Who Watch entry on Majipoor.com.

1967 American novels
1967 science fiction novels
American science fiction novels
Novels by Robert Silverberg
Fiction set in 1982
Signet Books books